Ada Poon is a professor of electrical engineering at Stanford University. She is the principal investigator of Stanford Integrated Biomedical Systems Lab.

Education, Career and Research
Ada Poon completed her undergraduate study in electrical and electronic engineering from the University of Hong Kong. She completed her M.S. (1999) and Ph.D. (2004) degrees from the EECS department at the University of California, Berkeley.

In 2005, she joined her advisor's startup company, SiBeam Inc. In 2006, she joined the faculty of University of Illinois, Urbana-Champaign. She has been faculty at Stanford Department of Electrical Engineering since 2008.

Dr. Poon's research is in integrated biomedical systems. Her research is focused on discovering ways to extremely miniaturize electronic devices such pacemaker, neuromodulators, and artificial pancreas so that they can be seamlessly implanted into patients with minimal invasiveness to provide targeted therapy for individuals.

As of July 2019, Ada Poon has been granted approximately 11 patents.

References

External links
 Stanford profile, Ada Poon 
 Stanford University profile, Ada Poon
 Poon Research Lab, Stanford Integrated Biomedical Systems

Stanford University Department of Electrical Engineering faculty
Living people
Year of birth missing (living people)
American women engineers
21st-century women engineers
American electrical engineers
Stanford University School of Engineering faculty
Stanford University alumni
Electrical engineering academics
Stanford University faculty
21st-century American women